This is a list of electoral division results for the 2016 Australian federal election in the state of South Australia.

Overall results

Liberal to Labor: Hindmarsh

Liberal to Xenophon: Mayo

Results by division

Adelaide

Barker

Boothby

Grey

Hindmarsh

Kingston

Makin

Mayo

Port Adelaide

Sturt

Wakefield

References

South Australia 2016